Minute Maid is a product line of beverages, usually associated with lemonade or orange juice, but which now extends to soft drinks of different kinds, including Hi-C. Minute Maid is sold under the Cappy brand in Central Europe and under the brand "Моя Семья" (Moya sem'ya, "My Family") in Russia and the Commonwealth of Independent States. 
Minute Maid was the first company to market frozen orange juice concentrate, allowing it to be distributed throughout the United States and served year-round. The Minute Maid Company is owned by The Coca-Cola Company, the world's largest marketer of fruit juices and drinks. The firm opened its headquarters in Sugar Land Town Square in Sugar Land, Texas, United States, on February 16, 2009; previously it was headquartered in the 2000 St. James Place building in Houston.

Overview 
The company was originally incorporated in 1945 as Florida Foods, Inc, then later became Vacuum Foods Corporation. It employs over 1,900 people and has over $2 billion in sales (1997 est.).

History

In 1945, the National Research Corporation (NRC) of Boston, Massachusetts, developed a method of dehydrating medical products for use in the U.S. war effort. The US Army wanted to extend this process to nutritious food, so NRC created a new subsidiary, the Florida Foods Corporation. Led by John M. Fox, Florida Foods Corporation won a government contract worth $750,000 for 500,000 lb (227,000 kg) of powdered orange juice for the war. The war ended and the contract was canceled before the factory could be built, but with investment, the company moved forward with a product.

Rather than selling powder to the public market, the company decided to create frozen orange juice concentrate, using a process that eliminated 80 percent of the water in orange juice. A Boston marketing firm H. A. Loudon Advertising came up with the name Minute Maid, implying the juice was quick and easy to prepare.

The first shipment took place in April 1946. The same month, the company was renamed Vacuum Foods Corporation. With limited funds for advertising, Fox himself went door to door giving free samples, until demand skyrocketed. In October 1948, TIME magazine announced that entertainer Bing Crosby was to employ a 5-day a week radio show to promote Minute Maid. The magazine article gave further details: "Minute Maid (retail price: 29¢ a pint and a half) got into the field first in 1945, at a new $2,300,000 plant in Plymouth, Fla. With little cash to advertise, it lost $450,262 the first two years. Last year it finally turned the corner. Says Vacuum’s President John M. Fox: “Why, this orange juice thing is the wonder of the grocery world. Ask anybody.” Anybody in the frozen food industry agreed—and Birds Eye, Snow Crop and others began to put out their own concentrate. Nevertheless, Vacuum’s sales increased so much that President Fox announced last week that the net profit for its last fiscal year was $179,865. Demand is so great, said Fox, that Vacuum has had to allocate shipments and is thinking of setting up a California plant. The shortage temporarily takes some of the bloom off the Crosby deal. But Vacuum hopes to step up output enough to fill the new orders Crosby will bring in. And in the scramble for the new market, Vacuum figures that Crosby is just the Pied Piper needed to lure customers away from the old brand names."The Crosby radio show ran until October 1950 and the ability to purchase fresh-tasting orange juice at any time of year, far from where oranges are grown, proved popular, and led to the company's national success.

In October 1949, the company adopted the name Minute Maid Corp. In late 1954, Minute Maid purchased rival Snow Crop.

The Minute Maid company was purchased by Coca-Cola in 1960.

In 1967, Minute Maid relocated to Houston, Texas, and joined with Duncan Foods to form the Coca-Cola Foods division.

In 1970, the company was involved in a scandal in the United States about bad housing, often referred to as "slave quarters", and working conditions of Minute Maid farm laborers in Florida. The United Farm Workers stepped in to support the workers. NBC reported on the issue in a 1970 documentary called Chet Huntley's Migrant: An NBC White Paper. In response to the bad press and a boycott in Florida, the company established a program that improved the workers' situation.

In 1973, the company released its first ready-to-drink, chilled orange juice product in the United States, entering an "orange juice war" with Tropicana.

In 1996, the company's name was changed from Minute Maid Corp. to The Minute Maid Company.

The Coca-Cola Company sold its Minute Maid orange groves in Florida in 1997. The United Farm Workers again took the side of the orange growers during this time.

In 2001, the Minute Maid division of Coca-Cola launched the Simply Orange brand, which "uses a computer-modeled blending of citrus sources with the intent for the consumer to enjoy a uniform taste year-round".

In 2002, Minute Maid bought the naming rights to re-brand the Houston Astros ballpark from Enron Field to Minute Maid Park.

In 2003, Minute Maid's division fully merged with Coca-Cola North America.

Products

Argentina
Minute Maid is marketed under the brand Cepita del Valle.
Apple, Homemade Apple, Homemade Orange, Multifruta, Nutridefensas Apple, Nutridefensas Orange, Orange, Peach, Pineapple
Aquarius
Apple, Grape, Grapefruit, Lemonade, Multifruta, Orange, Pear, Pink Grapefruit
Slightly Sparkling Aquarius
Zero Calories Citrus, Zero Calories Lemonade, Zero Calories Pear
Aquarius Zero
Apple, Grapefruit, Lemonade, Orange

Brazil 
 Minute Maid Mais - Del Valle
 Apple, Cashew, Cashew Mango, Grape, Guava, Mango, Orange, Passion fruit, Peach, Homemade Orange

Canada
 Minute Maid 100% Juice
 Pure Squeezed Orange Juice, Pulp Free Pure Squeezed Orange Juice, Home Squeezed Style Orange Juice, Original Orange Juice, Pulp Free Orange Juice, Low Acid Orange Juice, Apple Juice, Apple Grape, Grapefruit Juice, Fruit Blend, Tropical Orange, and Mixed Berry
 Simply Orange Juice
Fortified Juices
 Original Orange Juice with Calcium and Vitamin D, Orange Tangerine with Calcium and Vitamin D
 Juice Drinks
 Fruit Punch, Berry Punch, Cranberry Punch, Grape Punch, Mango Punch, Orange Guava Punch, Peach Punch, Raspberry Punch, Orange Punch, Cranberry Cocktail, Pink Grapefruit Cocktail
 Lemonades
Lemonade, Pink Lemonade
 Tim Horton's Bottled Coffee
 Regular, Double Double, IcedCapp Moca

Colombia 
 Del Valle

Costa Rica 
In Costa Rica Minute Maid sells Hi-C products.

Chile 
 Minute Maid is marketed under the brand Andina Del Valle

China 
Marketed under the name 美汁源(MěiZhīYuán) with the following variants:
 Minute Maid Pulpy (Orange) - first billion dollar Coca-Cola brand to emerge from China
 Minute Maid Aloe & White Grape Juice
 Minute Maid Red Grape Juice
 Minute Maid Vit.C Lemon
 Minute Maid Grapefruit
 Minute Maid Exotic Fruits
 Minute Maid Peach
 Minute Maid Super Milky

France 
 Minute Maid 100% fruit Juice
 100% Orange Juice - Orange Juice drink with 100% orange juice
 100% Apple Juice - Apple Juice drink with 100% apple juice (Granny Smith)
 Red Sensation - 100% juice drink made with apple, raspberry, and blackcurrant juices
 Minute Maid InCase Juice Drinks
 Banana-Pineapple - enhanced with vitamins and calcium
 Banana-Cherry -Blackcurrant - enhanced with vitamins and calcium
 Minute Maid Nectar Juice Drink
 Tropical - juice drink made from orange, apricot, guava, mango, passion fruit and sugar
Minute Maid In The Cafe
 Orange
 Strawberry
 Apple
 Tomato
 Raisin
 Peach

Dominican Republic 

In the Dominican Republic Minute Maid came to market in December 2007 with orange flavor, and in May 2008 launched the flavors of raspberry, apple and strawberry, in summer 2009 and launched the flavors of pear and carrot.

Hong Kong
 Minute Maid Pulpy orange juice
 Minute Maid grapefruit juice
 Minute Maid lemonade juice
 Minute Maid aloe vera juice
 Minute Maid apple juice

Iceland 
 Minute Maid is sold under the brand name Tropi by company Vífilfell.

India 
 Minute Maid Pulpy Orange Drink - Orange Juice drink made from concentrate.
 Minute Maid Nimbu Drink - Lemon juice drink
 Minute Maid Apple - Apple juice 
 Minute Maid Mixed Fruit - A mixed fruit juice
 Minute Maid Mango - Mango Juice Drink
 Minute maid Mosambi (Minute Maid Sweet Lime) - pulpy citrus limon juice
 Minute Maid 100% - Grape, Apple, Orange
 Minute Maid Lychee drink
 Minute Maid Tender coconut drink 100% natural and refreshing drink
 Minute Maid Gritty guava

Indonesia 

 Minute Maid Pulpy - Juice drink made from concentrate with some orange pulp.
Orange, O'Mango (Orange and Mango), Tropical (Apple, Mango, Pineapple, Guava, Passion fruit)
 Minute Maid Pulpy Apple Crush - Apple Juice drink made from concentrate with some apple bits.
 Minute Maid Pulpy Aloe Vera with White Grape - White Grape juice drink made from concentrate with some aloe leaf meat.
 Minute Maid Pulpy Fruit Bite
Orange, Pineapple, Mango
 Minute Maid Refresh - Orange juice drink.
 Minute Maid Nutriforce
 Minute Maid Nutriboost

Japan 
 Minute Maid Fruit Plus - Juice drink.
 Apple Guava, Lemon Lime, Orange Peach
 Minute Maid Qoo
 Orange, Apple, Yoghurt
 Minute Maid Craftz Mint Lemonade
 Minute Maid Smoothie
 Mango Carrot Mix (Banana, Mango, Apple, Lemon, Carrot) with some apple pulp
 Acai Banana Mix (Apple, Banana, Grape, Lemon, Peach) with some apple and acai pulp
 Minute Maid Otona no Zeitaku Ringo - 100% apple juice with carbonate and flavor.
 Minute Maid Morning Fruit
 Cassis and Grape
 Pink Grapefruit Blend (Grapefruit, Apple, Grape)
 Orange Blend (Orange, Grape, Apple, Mandarin Orange, Lemon)
 Healthy Formula Acai Mix (Grape, Cassis, Blueberry, Acai extract)
 Healthy Formula Pomegranate Mix (Apple, Pomegranate, Grapefruit, Cranberry)
 Minute Maid Orange 100%
 Minute Maid Pink Grapefruit 100%
 Minute Maid Peach Blend 100% (Peach, Apple, Grape)
 Minute Maid Red & Green Apple 100%
 Minute Maid Grape 100%
 Minute Maid Fruit & Vegetable (Orange, Grape, Apple, Lemon, Pineapple, Carrot, Celery, Parsley, Pumpkin)
 Minute Maid Morning Jelly - Jelly drink.
 Minute Maid Morning Banana
 Minute Maid Morning Mango
 Minute Maid Morning Apple
 Minute Maid Aloe & White Grape - White Grape juice drink with some aloe leaf meat.
 Minute Maid Hachimitsu Yuzu (Honey and Yuzu) - Shikoku Yuzu juice drink with honey.

Kazakhstan 
 Minute Maid is marketed under the brand "Piko".  
juice/nectar: apple, apricot, peach

Kenya 
 Minute Maid - Mango Orange.
 Contains a mixture of Mango and Orange
minute maid pulpy orange 100%
Minute Maid - Tropical
Contains a mixture of tropical fruits

Now available in Boost (Value added with milk and Vitamins) and Nutri Defensus,

Malaysia 
 Minute Maid - Pulpy
 Contains pure orange juice and orange pulpy

Mexico 
 Del valle Forte - Fruit Juices and Nectars.
 Apple, Orange, Grape, Peach, Pineapple, Mango, Tomato, 100% Orange Juice, 100% Apple Juice, Fibramix (Apple, Pineapple and Pear mix) and Fruits (Strawberry, Banana, Guava, Pineapple, Mango and Orange mix)
 Minute Maid Revita - Fruit Drink.
 Limoné (Lemon), Marandú (Apple, Orange and Peach) and Melondía (Watermelon and Cantaloupe)
 Minute Maid Nutri+ - Fruit Juice.
 Apple, Orange, Grape, Peach

Netherlands 
 Minute Maid 100% fruit Juice
 100% Orange Juice - Orange Juice drink with 100% orange juice
 100% Apple Juice - Apple Juice drink with 100% apple juice
 100% Tomato Juice - Tomato Juice
 100% Mulityfruits - Multifruits

New Zealand 
In New Zealand, Minute Maid is marketed as Keri Juice Co.
 Keri Apple
 Keri Kitchen Pineapple
 Keri Pulpy Pineapple
 Keri Pulpy Orange
 Keri Cranberry
 Keri 50% less sugar

Pakistan 
Minute Maid entered the Pakistani market in 2008. Here they have used the same advertising concept as they have used in India i.e. "where is the pulp?".

 Minute Maid Pulpy Orange
 Minute Maid Pulpy Tropical
 Minute Maid Pulpy Nimbu/Lemon (Launched in 2012 and discontinued the same year)

Paraguay 
 Minute Maid is sold under the brand name Frugos del Valle.
 Frugos Néctar de Naranja (Orange Nectar)
 Frugos Néctar de Manzana (Apple Nectar)
 Frugos Néctar de Durazno (Peach Nectar)

Philippines 
 Minute Maid Fresh, ready-to-drink juice
 Minute Maid Pulpy Orange, with real pulp bits
 Minute Maid Pulpy Mango-Orange, with real pulp bits
 Minute Maid Pulpy Four Seasons, with real pulp bits 
 Minute Maid bite

Peru 
 Frugos

Romania 
Marketed under the brand Cappy and has the following assortments:
 Cappy Orange
 Cappy Peach
 Cappy Sicilian Red Orange
 Cappy Pear
 Cappy Sour Cherry

Russia 
Minute Maid is marketed under the brand "Моя семья" (eng. "My family"). Also Minute Maid Pulpy Orange is selling under the brand "Добрый" (eng. "Kind")

Spain 
 Minute Maid AntiOx - Combination of fruit juices with antioxidizing properties.
 Orange, Raspberry and Haw, Pineapple, Blackcurrant and Plum
 Minute Maid Clásicos - Unsweetened fruit juices.
 Orange, Peach and grape, Pineapple and grape, Multifruit
 Minute Maid Duofrutas - Mix of fruit juice, skimmed milk and vitamins.
 Mediterranean, Tropical
 Minute Maid Limón&Nada - Lemonade drink available in Spain.
 Classic, Mint.
 Minute Maid Selección - Fruit juices and nectars.
 Orange, Tomato, Apple, Pineapple, Peach, Grape
 Minute Maid Premium - 100% fruit juices.
 Orange, Pineapple, Orange with Calcium
 Minute Maid SojaPlus - Drink with fruit juice and soy.
 Latin fruits

United States 

 Minute Maid Premium Orange Juice and Premium Blends (Frozen & Refrigerated) - Fruit drinks
 Original, Original + Calcium, Country Style, Extra Vitamin C and E plus Zinc, Kids+, Home Squeezed Style, Home Squeezed Style + Calcium, Pulp-Free, Low Acid, Light, Orange Tangerine + Calcium, Orange Passion + Calcium
 Minute Maid Blends
 Orange Cranberry, Orange Passion, Orange Strawberry Banana, Orange Tangerine
 Minute Maid Premium Lemonades - Juice drinks.
 Country Style Lemonade, Lemonade, Pink Lemonade, Limeade, Cherry Limeade, Lemonade Iced Tea, Raspberry Lemonade, Soft Frozen Lemonade, Orangeade
 Minute Maid Premium Punches - Juice drinks.
 Fruit Punch, Berry Punch, Tropical Punch, Citrus Punch, Grape Punch, Mango Punch, Peach Punch.
 Minute Maid Active - Orange juice drink enriched with Glucosamine HCI.
 Minute Maid Coolers - Fruit beverages.
 Minute Maid Pomegranate Blueberry Flavored Blend of 5 Juices - This product was the target of a 2014 false advertising lawsuit. POM Wonderful, a company selling 100% pomegranate juice sued the Coca-Cola company because the Minute Maid product contains only .3% pomegranate juice and 99.4% apple juice.
 Minute Maid Heart Wise - Orange juice drink naturally sourced with plant sterols.
 Minute Maid Juice Box - 100% juice drink.
 Apple Juice, Fruit Punch, Grape, Orange Tropical, Orange, Mixed Berry, Lemonade
 Minute Maid Juice To Go - Juice drink marketed in plastic bottles to drink on the go.
 Apple, Apple Cranberry, Apple Cranberry Raspberry, Apple Grape, Berry, Citrus Blend, Cranberry, Cranberry Grape, Cranberry Lemon, Fruit Punch, Grape, Graprefruit, Lemon Raspberry, Orange, Pineapple Orange Juice, Raspberry Strawberry
 Minute Maid Just 10 - Fruit punch flavored juice drink.
 Minute Maid Enhanced - Mango Tropical, Strawberry Kiwi, Pomegranate Berry 12-oz PET, all enhanced with yerba mate for a natural energy lift; 27% juice blend
 Minute Maid Lemonades and Fruit Drinks - Fruit drink.
 Lemonade, Pink Lemonade, Raspberry Lemonade, Limeade, Fruit Punch, Strawberry Passion, Tropical Citrus, Berry Kiwi
 Minute Maid Light - Low calorie fruit drinks.
 Lemonade, Raspberry Passion, Mango Tropical, Guava Citrus, Cherry Limeade
 Minute Maid Multi-Vitamin - Orange juice enriched with vitamins.
 Minute Maid Premium Juices & Cocktails
 Apple Juice, Grape Juice Cocktail, Ruby Red Grapefruit Blend, Cranberry Apple Cocktail
 Disney Hundred Acre Wood 100% Juice Beverages
 Apple Strawberry, Apple Grape, Apple Raspberry Peach, Apple Cherry Banana
 Minute Maid Soft Drinks
 Orange, Diet Orange, Lemon Lime, Diet Lemon Lime, Grape, Fruit Punch, Strawberry, Pineapple, Black Cherry
 Simply Orange - premium not-from-concentrate fruit juices
 Simply Orange: Grove Made (high-pulp), Country Stand (medium-pulp), Original (pulp-free), Calcium (pulp-free with 32% Dietary Reference Intake of calcium), With Mango, With Pineapple
 Simply Lemonade, Simply Lemonade With Raspberry
 Simply Limeade
 Simply Grapefruit
 Simply Apple
 Minute Maid Aguas Frescas - a flavored non-carbonated juice beverage inspired by Latin American drinks.
 Strawberry, hibiscus, mango

Taiwan 
Minute Maid Pulpy orange juice
Minute Maid grapefruit juice
Minute Maid lemonade juice
Minute Maid grape aloe vera juice
Minute Maid apple aloe vera juice
Minute Maid Pulpy Tropical Fruit Juice

Trinidad and Tobago 
Caribbean Bottlers Ltd

Venezuela 
 Sonfil: Orange Juice

Vietnam 
 Minute Maid Teppy Orange Drink - Orange Juice drink made from concentrate.

Mongolia 
Minute Maid Punch Honey pear
Minute Maid Punch Apple
Minute Maid Grape
Minute Maid Orange
Minute Maid Pulpy Orange
Minute Maid Pineapple
Minute Maid Punch Peach
Minute Maid Guava
Minute Maid Tropical
Minute Maid Mango

Other products 
 Bibo
 Hi-C
 Bacardi Mixers
 Odwalla Beverages
 Qoo
 Five Alive Citrus Beverages
 Bright & Early Breakfast Beverages
 Minute Maid Frozen Fruit Bars
 Minute Maid Deli
 Minute Maid Fresh
 Minute Maid Soft Drink
 Minute Maid Splash

Headquarters

Minute Maid original offices were located in New York.
John M Fox, president of the company announced on October 20, 1957, that Minute Maid Headquarters would be moved to a new building located on the corner of US 441 and Hwy Route 50 in Orlando, Florida.

Minute Maid has its headquarters in an office building in the Sugar Land Town Square development in First Colony, Sugar Land, Texas.

In 1985, The Coca-Cola Company purchased the 2000 St. James Place in Houston from Bechtel Corporation for Minute Maid. Minute Maid moved into the new office building the following year.

In 2007, Coca-Cola retained New York-based Corporate Realty Consultants and Boyd Commercial LLC of Houston to sell 2000 St. James Place. The company negotiated with Planned Community Developers to lease an office building in Sugar Land Town Square. Then, in January 2008, Minute Maid announced plans to move its headquarters to Sugar Land. The headquarters building is located at Sugar Land's town center and opened on February 16, 2009. The city of Sugar Land gave the company a $2.4 million tax incentive to move its headquarters there.

On March 6, 2021, amid the COVID-19 pandemic, Coca-Cola announced it was closing Minute Maid's office in Sugar Land and would join the operations with the company's base in Atlanta, Georgia.

See also
 Cappy
 Economy of Houston
 List of lemonade topics

References

External links

Juice brands
Coca-Cola brands
Drink companies of the United States
Manufacturing companies based in Houston
Companies based in Sugar Land, Texas
American companies established in 1945
Food and drink companies established in 1945
1945 establishments in Massachusetts
American brands
Food and drink companies based in Texas
Coca-Cola acquisitions
1960 mergers and acquisitions